Pierre Plihon (born 29 October 1989 in Nice), is a French athlete who competes in recurve archery.

Plihon first competed internationally in 2014, in which year he won a team gold medal at the 2014 European Archery Championships in Echmiadzin and qualified for the 2014 World Cup Final in Lausanne, including a silver medal at the first stage in Shanghai.
 He represented France at the 2016 Summer Olympics in Rio de Janeiro and at 2020 Summer Olympics in Tokyo.

References

External links
  
 
 

1989 births
Living people
French male archers
Archers at the 2015 European Games
Archers at the 2016 Summer Olympics
Olympic archers of France
European Games medalists in archery
Archers at the 2019 European Games
European Games gold medalists for France
Archers at the 2020 Summer Olympics
21st-century French people